Craigton is a village in Angus, Scotland. It lies to the north of the Downie Hills, approximately three miles north of Carnoustie. Immediately to the west of the village lie the reservoirs of Monikie Country Park, and to the south is the Panmure Testimonial.

References

Villages in Angus, Scotland